María Cristina "Cris" Cornejo Vega (born 9 January 1992) is a Spanish footballer who plays for Alavés as a goalkeeper.

She began her career in the Basque regional leagues with Intxaurdi KE, being signed by Real Sociedad who soon gave the 16-year-old her Primera División debut. She remained with the Txuri-urdin for nine seasons, making over 100 appearances, although she was often second-choice in the squad behind the older Sokoa Azkarate, then the younger Mariasun Quiñones.

In 2018, Cornejo moved to second-tier Eibar along with three Real Sociedad teammates, and helped them to finish in a position to move into the new Segunda División Pro. A year later – along with defender Gaste, another of the group who had switched to Eibar – she signed for Alavés, of the same level, and was the regular goalkeeper as they won the title and gained promotion to the Primera in the 2020–21 season.

References

External links
 
Cris at BDFutbol

1992 births
Living people
Spanish women's footballers
Footballers from San Sebastián
Women's association football goalkeepers
Segunda Federación (women) players
Primera División (women) players
Deportivo Alavés Gloriosas players
SD Eibar Femenino players
Real Sociedad (women) players